Mohamed Azmi (born 1921) was an Egyptian water polo player. He competed in the men's tournament at the 1960 Summer Olympics.

See also
 Egypt men's Olympic water polo team records and statistics
 List of men's Olympic water polo tournament goalkeepers

References

External links
 

1921 births
Possibly living people
Egyptian male water polo players
Water polo goalkeepers
Olympic water polo players of Egypt
Water polo players at the 1960 Summer Olympics
Sportspeople from Cairo
20th-century Egyptian people